Zirconium(III) iodide is an inorganic compound with the formula ZrI3.

Preparation
Like other group 4 trihalides, zirconium(III) iodide can be prepared from zirconium(IV) iodide by high-temperature reduction with zirconium metal, although incomplete reaction and contamination of the product with excess metal often occurs.

3 ZrI4 + Zr → 4 ZrI3

An alternative is to crystallise zirconium(III) iodide from a solution of zirconium(III) in aluminium triiodide. The solution is prepared by reducing a eutectic solution of ZrI4 in liquid AlI3 at a temperature of 280–300 °C with metallic zirconium or aluminium.

Structure and bonding
Zirconium(III) iodide has a lower magnetic moment than is expected for the d1 metal ion Zr3+, indicating non-negligible Zr–Zr bonding.

The crystal structure of zirconium(III) iodide is based on hexagonal close packing of iodide ions with one third of the octahedral interstices occupied by Zr3+ ions. The structure consists of parallel chains of face-sharing {ZrI6} octahedra with unequally spaced metal atoms. The Zr–Zr separation alternates between 3.17 Å and 3.51 Å.

ZrCl3, ZrBr3 and ZrI3 adopt structures very similar to the β-TiCl3 structure. In all three ZrX3 there is some elongation of the octahedra along the metal-metal axis, partly due to metal-metal repulsion, but the elongation is most pronounced in the chloride, moderate in the bromide and negligible in the iodide.

References

Zirconium(III) compounds
Iodides
Metal halides